The Minister of Nordic Cooperation is a ministerial post given to a member of the Norwegian cabinet and is held concurrently with their respective posts. It was created in 1971 and does not have its own ministry, but is regardless given to any member of a cabinet. The minister is responsible for tasks related to Nordic cooperation.

List of ministers

References

Nordic Cooperation